Ivakino is a rural locality (a village) in Staroselskoye Rural Settlement, Vologodsky District, Vologda Oblast, Russia. The population was 4 as of 2002.

Geography 
Ivakino is located 47 km southwest of Vologda (the district's administrative centre) by road. Novgorodovo is the nearest rural locality.

References 

Rural localities in Vologodsky District